Neoglaziovia is a genus in the plant family Bromeliaceae, subfamily Bromelioideae.

The genus is named in honor of Auguste François Marie Glaziou, French landscape designer and bromeliad collector (1833-1906).

Species
It has three known species, all endemic to the  Atlantic Forest biome (Mata Atlantica Brasileira) in southeast Brazil. 
 Neoglaziovia burle-marxii Leme — endemic to Bahia state. Named for Roberto Burle Marx (1904-1994), a renowned Brazilian artist, botanist, garden designer, and native flora collector/plantsman.
 Neoglaziovia concolor C.H. Wright — endemic to Bahia state
 Neoglaziovia variegata (Arruda da Camara) Mez — native to states of Bahia, Ceará, Minas Gerais, Paraíba, Piauí, and Rio Grande do Norte.

Cultivation and uses
Neoglaziovia variegata has been, and continues to be, an important part of localized markets in South America — where its fibers are woven into fabric, netting, and rope.

References

External links
 FCBS.org:   Neoglaziovia photos
 BSI Genera Gallery: photos of Neoglaziovia

Bromelioideae
Endemic flora of Brazil
Flora of the Atlantic Forest
Flora of Bahia
Environment of Ceará
Flora of Espírito Santo
Flora of Minas Gerais
Flora of Paraíba
Flora of Rio Grande do Norte
Fiber plants
Bromeliaceae genera